Ceremonials is the second studio album by English indie rock band Florence and the Machine. It was released on 28 October 2011 by Island Records. The band started working on the album in 2010 and finished it in 2011. The standard edition of the album was entirely produced by Paul Epworth, who also worked prominently on the band's debut album Lungs (2009).

Ceremonials received generally positive reviews from music critics, who drew comparisons to artists such as Kate Bush, while also praising the instrumentation, Florence Welch's vocals and the production of the songs. It appeared on several year-end critics' lists in late 2011. At the 55th Annual Grammy Awards, the album received a nomination for Best Pop Vocal Album, while "Shake It Out" was nominated for Best Pop Duo/Group Performance. Ceremonials debuted at number one on the UK Albums Chart, becoming the band's second consecutive number-one album. It also debuted at number one in Australia, Ireland and New Zealand, and peaked at number six on the US Billboard 200, becoming the band's first top-10 album in the United States. It has sold 2 million copies worldwide.

Five singles were released from Ceremonials. "What the Water Gave Me" was released on 23 August 2011 as a teaser for the album. "Shake It Out" was released on 30 September 2011 as the album's official lead single, becoming one of the band's most commercially successful singles to date. "No Light, No Light" was released on 16 January 2012 as the second single from the album, and "Never Let Me Go" was released on 30 March 2012. "Spectrum (Say My Name)" was released on 5 July 2012, and fuelled by a remix by Scottish DJ Calvin Harris, became Florence and the Machine's first number-one single in the UK. The album's fifth and final single, "Lover to Lover", was released on 30 November 2012. Ceremonials was also promoted by the band by a worldwide tour, the Ceremonials Tour (2011–12). The album's sound is described as baroque pop, art pop, indie pop, neo soul, power pop and gothic pop.

Background
NME magazine confirmed that after the release of the song "Heavy in Your Arms" for the soundtrack to The Twilight Saga: Eclipse (2010), lead singer Florence Welch entered the studio for a two-week session to record with producer Paul Epworth, with whom she worked on the band's debut album, Lungs (2009). She said that the two recordings that came out of that session were inspired by science because "a lot of her family are doctors or trying to become doctors, so much of her conversations are fixated on medical stuff." In an interview with the Gibson website on 17 February 2011, guitarist Rob Ackroyd stated, "Work on the second album has begun with Paul Epworth and there is talk of booking out Abbey Road for a month in April/May to record." In June 2011, Epworth told BBC 6 Music that the album would probably be finished "by the end of July" and described the sound as "a lot less indie and lot more soulful". He also indicated that there were 16 songs up for inclusion on the album, but that this would be reduced upon the time of release. Pitchfork confirmed on 23 August 2011 that the album was produced solely by Epworth. On 12 September 2011, Canadian radio broadcaster Alan Cross revealed that Florence and the Machine's second album would be titled Ceremonials. He also commented on the album by saying, "I've heard a little more than half the record and it is big, soulful and powerful. Think Adele or Tori Amos but with some serious Kate Bush DNA, especially with the rhythm section."

Regarding the album's title, Welch told MTV News, "It was an art installation done in the '70s, this video piece all done on Super 8, this big procession of kind of coquette-style hippies and all these different colored robes and masks, and it was all to do with color, really saturated, brightly colored pastas and balloons. I saw it a couple years ago, and it was called 'Ceremonials' and then, like, Roman numerals after it. And the word sort of stuck with me, and I think the whole idea of performance, and kind of putting on this outfit and going out almost to find some sort of exorcism or absolution, to kind of get outside yourself, there's a sense of ceremony to it." Welch also revealed that she wanted to call the album Violence, stating, "I wanted to make an album that sounded like the soundtrack to Baz Luhrmann's Romeo + Juliet, the violence mixed with the classical Shakespearean drama mixed with the pop and the pulp, extreme neon stuff." In an interview with The Guardian, she described the album as "much bigger" and categorised its genre as "chamber soul", a mixture of chamber pop and soul. The liner notes of Ceremonials contain an essay by English writer Emma Forrest, dated 21 September 2011.

Promotion

The song "Strangeness and Charm"—which was ultimately included on the deluxe edition of Ceremonials—was debuted on 2 May 2010 at the Olympia Theatre in Dublin, Ireland, during the band's Cosmic Love Tour. The song was later recorded live at the Hammersmith Apollo on another stop of The Cosmic Love Tour and was included on the re-release of Lungs, titled Between Two Lungs, along with other live tracks and previously unreleased B-sides. Welch describes the song as "about seven minutes long and pretty relentless" and also "dancey, but it's also dark as well", featuring "relentless drums and heavy, droning bass." During their North American tour, Florence and the Machine debuted "What the Water Gave Me" at the Greek Theatre in Berkeley, California, on 12 June 2011. On 23 August 2011, the song was released as a promotional single from the album, along with an accompanying music video.

Florence and the Machine embarked on several live performances to promote Ceremonials. The band premiered four tracks from the album—"Only If for a Night", "Never Let Me Go", "Heartlines" and "Spectrum"—at The Creators Project, a partnership between Vice and Intel, in Brooklyn's Dumbo neighbourhood on 15 October 2011. They launched the album with an exclusive gig at the Hackney Empire in London on 25 October, which was live-streamed on The Guardian website. On 1 November, they performed "What the Water Gave Me" and "No Light, No Light" on the British music television show Later... with Jools Holland. On 6 November, the band made their first appearance on The X Factor, where they performed "Shake It Out" on the double elimination results show. "Shake It Out" was also performed on the Irish late-night talk show The Late Late Show (28 October), The X Factor Australia (15 November) and Good Morning America (21 November).

They performed "Shake It Out" and "What the Water Gave Me" on the Canal+ show La Musicale in France on 18 November. The following day, Florence and the Machine appeared on the American sketch comedy show Saturday Night Live for the second time, performing "Shake It Out" and "No Light, No Light". The group stopped by BBC Radio 1 on 25 November for a special Live Lounge set, which included performances of "Shake It Out", "What the Water Gave Me", "Rabbit Heart (Raise It Up)", "Dog Days Are Over" and "No Light, No Light", as well as a cover of "Take Care" by Drake featuring Rihanna. They performed "Spectrum" on The X Factor USA semi-final results show on 15 December. The band performed at the Los Angeles portion of Dick Clark's New Year's Rockin' Eve with Ryan Seacrest,<ref>{{cite web |last=Kaufman |first=Gil |url=http://www.mtv.com/news/1675506/nicki-minaj-dick-clarks-new-years-eve/ |title=Nicki Minaj, LMFAO Join Dick Clark's New Year's Rockin' Eve' |publisher=MTV News |date=7 December 2011 |accessdate=2 February 2016}}</ref> which was broadcast live on 31 December on ABC. The band performed "No Light, No Light" at the 2012 Brit Awards at the O2 Arena in on 21 February 2012. On 2 July 2012, a music video for "Breaking Down" was officially released.

The song "Heartlines" was featured in the 10th episode of the fifth season of The CW's teen drama series Gossip Girl, originally aired 5 December 2011. "Seven Devils" appeared in the trailer to promote the second season of the HBO series Game of Thrones, as well as in the season one finale of the ABC series Revenge, which was broadcast 23 May 2012. It was also used in the trailer for the 2013 romantic fantasy film Beautiful Creatures. "Never Let Me Go" was used in the 19th episode of the third season of The Vampire Diaries on 19 April 2012, in the pilot of Beauty & the Beast on 11 October 2012 and in the second episode of the third season of Nikita on 26 October 2012 "Leave My Body", "No Light, No Light" and "Never Let Me Go" were all featured during the ninth and final season of One Tree Hill. "Bedroom Hymns" was featured in a trailer for the 2013 romantic drama film The Great Gatsby.

Singles
"What the Water Gave Me" was released on 23 August 2011 as the first taster of Ceremonials. The promotional single debuted at number 24 on the UK Singles Chart. It saw moderate chart success elsewhere, reaching number 13 in Ireland, number 15 in New Zealand and number 35 in Australia.

"Shake It Out" was released as the album's official lead single on 30 September 2011. It premiered exclusively on XFM London on 14 September 2011. The song peaked at number 12 on the UK Singles Chart, becoming Florence and the Machine's fourth top-20 single. Internationally, it reached number two on the Irish Singles Chart, while charting inside the top 20 in Austria, New Zealand and Norway, the top 30 in Germany and Switzerland, the top 40 in Australia, and the top 50 in Sweden.

"No Light, No Light" was released on 13 January 2012 as the second single from the album. The single reached number 63 on the UK Singles Chart. The accompanying video, released on 18 November 2011, caused controversy after it was accused of racism due to its perceived use of blackface by an actor in the video, and was also criticised for its depiction of voodoo.

"Never Let Me Go" was released on 30 March 2012 as the third single from the album. The music video was released on 7 March 2012. The track charted at number 82 in the UK, while reaching number three in Australia, the band's highest-peaking single in that country to date.

A remix of "Spectrum" by Scottish DJ and producer Calvin Harris, subtitled "Say My Name", was released on 5 July 2012 as the album's fourth single. It became the band's first number-one single in both the UK and Ireland.

"Lover to Lover" was released as the fifth and final single from the album on 30 November 2012. Directed by Vincent Haycock, the music video debuted on 19 November and features a new single version of the song.

Tour

To promote the album, Florence and the Machine embarked on their second worldwide tour titled the Ceremonials Tour on 13 October 2011. The set list includes songs from the band's two studio albums. The tour included numerous performances at music festivals as that is Welch's favourite way to perform live. During an interview with MTV News, Welch discussed the nature of the tour, saying, "In a way, it's not going to be too big a production; we've done a lot of quite extravagant stuff, and that's been amazing, but for this tour, it's definitely going to be about showcasing the music [...] The songs are going to be the most important thing. It will be heavily based on the music [...] no bells and whistles just yet, we're going to try and keep it quite pure." The tour ended in December 2012, after two years of worldwide touring.

Critical receptionCeremonials received generally positive reviews from music critics. At Metacritic, which assigns a weighted mean rating out of 100 to reviews from mainstream critics, the album received an average score of 75, based on 36 reviews. Laura Foster of Clash called the album a "confident, cohesive effort" and found that "[t]he steady hand of Paul Epworth on production has helped Florence to take the winning formula of her distinctive vocals and melodies, the twinkling harps and thundering drums, and augment it with string arrangements, subtle electro touches, and gospel choirs." Entertainment Weeklys Kyle Anderson praised it as a "confident, unflinching tour de force" and commented, "If her acclaimed 2009 debut, Lungs, was a scrappy shrine to survival and empowerment, its follow-up is a baroque cathedral, bedecked with ornate tapestries made of ghostly choirs, pagan-rhythmic splendor, and a whole lot of harp." AllMusic critic James Christopher Monger wrote, "Bigger and bolder than 2009's excellent Lungs, Ceremonials rolls in like fog over the Thames, doling out a heavy-handed mix of Brit-pop-infused neo-soul anthems and lush, movie trailer-ready ballads that fuse the bluesy, electro-despair of Adele with the ornate, gothic melodrama of Kate Bush and Floodland-era Sisters of Mercy." Margaret Wappler of the Los Angeles Times found that Welch had "found a way to honor her Bjorkian appetites for lavish orchestral spectacle while finding the depth and subtlety of her voice".

Barry Nicolson of NME noted that "by taking what worked about Lungs and amplifying those qualities to a natural, satisfying conclusion, Florence has made a near-great pop record that should afford her the creative freedom to do whatever the hell she wants next time around." Rolling Stone writer Jody Rosen commented that the album contains "turbulent ballads, powered by booming drums and vocal chorales rising like distant thunder, full of Welch's banshee wails. The music touches on Celtic melodies, bluesy rock stomps, nods to goth and gospel." The Daily Telegraphs Neil McCormick viewed Ceremonials as "a giant, fluid, emotionally resonant album" and stated, "Contrary to the name she has given her band, the Machine feel organic and human, providing an epic, full-blooded soundtrack to Welch's voodoo, in which rhythm, melody and chanting are employed to drive out neuroses and insecurities, characterised as ghosts and devils." Rob Harvilla of Spin described Welch as "a bloodied, bloodying songbird in a gilded cage of immaculately crafted, slow-burn, chest-beating empowerment anthems, gripping steel bars that her elegantly volcanic voice could shred at any moment", adding, "She's so much better than her material that her material is rendered immaterial."

Michael Hann of The Guardian concluded that the album "always sounds wonderful—producer Paul Epworth has created a warm, soft, four-poster featherbed of sound for Welch to emote over—but it never really satisfies. One yearns for Welch's wonderful voice to be delivering lines of more import than the nonsense she's often delivering here." In a mixed review, Slant Magazines Matthew Cole wrote that "[t]he first four tracks of Ceremonials are essentially flawless", but felt that the album "can't help but get weaker as it continues, a fact which owes less to the quality of the songwriting than to the album's length [...] and a far less dynamic second act." Andy Gill of The Independent expressed, "[I]n cementing one style, some of the possibilities offered by Lungs have been choked off. The only time [Welch] and The Machine stray from the formula is the Krautrock-disco motorik of 'Spectrum'; elsewhere, declamatory piano chords and burring organ underpin the banked, soaring vocals that are her trademark". Pitchforks Ryan Dombal argued, "Instead of Lungs largely charming yet discombobulating diversity, Ceremonials suffers from a repetitiveness that's akin to looking at a skyline filled with 100-story behemoths lined-up one after the other, blocking out everything but their own size."

Accolades
Ceremonials was named the best album of 2011 by Q magazine. Time magazine ranked it as the second best album of 2011, stating, "Despite her penchant for emotive gloom, Welch's tales of heartache can be oddly uplifting; when she sings about darkness and demons, we know she will ultimately conquer them." Entertainment Weekly, on its list of the 10 Best Albums of 2011, listed the album at number five and wrote, "A big believer in Red Sea-parting melodrama, she's got the orchestral grandeur to pull it off. Of course, it helps that she attacks the harp as if she were wielding an ax." Billboard placed it at number eight on its list of the 10 Best Albums of 2011, noting that "Shake It Out" and "What the Water Gave Me" "possess an anthemic quality, but they're far from the only epic moments on the rock-tinged record, which finds Welch channeling avant-pop luminaries like Annie Lennox and Kate Bush." Slant Magazine included Ceremonials at number 22 on its list of The 25 Best Albums of 2011, commenting that the album is "steeped in melodrama, with pump organs, choirs, and strings expertly deployed as pure pomp on already rousing singles like 'Shake It Out' and 'No Light, No Light.' But Welch is perfectly capable of doing delicate too, as evidenced by the gorgeously textured lead single 'What the Water Gave Me' and 'Never Let Me Go,' while tracks like "Lover to Lover" are reminiscent of the Eurythmics at their most soulful." PopMatters ranked the album at number 25 on its list of The 75 Best Albums of 2011, calling it "an expansive album, haunted by tragedy but boldly offering a comforting embrace in reply."

The A.V. Club named it the 26th best album of 2011 and claimed, "A perfect blend of majestic and morose, Ceremonials establishes Welch as one of the most boundary-pushing divas in the business." Rolling Stone ranked the album at number 27 on its list of the 50 Best Albums of 2011, adding, "From 'Shake It Out' to the arena-scale Motown of 'Lover to Lover', Big Red brings it again and again, choirs and string players backing a voice that soars so high, it makes them seem like ants on the ground below." Clash, on its list of The Top 40 Albums of 2011, included Ceremonials at number 28 and opined that the album "heralded the triumphant return of one of Britain's most exciting pop stars. Bettering the sound she first developed on Lungs, the only problem she faces now is deciding which of its massive songs to release as singles." The NME placed the album at number 31 on its list of the 50 Best Albums of 2011, writing that the album "amounted to pop in its purest sense, as something grand and strange and with ambitions higher than mere humanity, as the triple-headed priestess-muse Florence depicted on its sleeve suggested."

The album earned the band nominations for British Female Solo Artist and MasterCard British Album of the Year at the 2012 Brit Awards. The following year at the 55th Annual Grammy Awards, Ceremonials received a nomination for Best Pop Vocal Album, and "Shake It Out" was nominated for Best Pop Duo/Group Performance.

Artwork
The cover artwork for Ceremonials was photographed by Florence and the Machine's longtime collaborator Tom Beard. In November 2019, it was announced that Beard's portrait of Welch for the album cover would be on permanent display at the National Portrait Gallery (NPG) of London in their New Acquisitions exhibition. According to the NPG, the portrait "signalled a new, sleeker aesthetic for Welch, inspired by Art Deco and early-twentieth-century fashion illustration."

Commercial performance
Ceremonials debuted at number one on the UK Albums Chart, selling approximately 38,000 copies in its first two days of release and 94,050 copies altogether in its first week. It fell to number three the following week, selling 58,278 copies. On 18 January 2013, Ceremonials was certified double platinum by the British Phonographic Industry (BPI), and by June 2015, it had sold 715,275 copies in the United Kingdom.

The album also debuted at number one in Australia, Ireland and New Zealand, and was certified gold by the Australian Recording Industry Association (ARIA) in its first week of sales. It was ultimately certified triple platinum by the ARIA in early 2013, signalling shipments of 210,000 copies. Selling 105,000 units in its opening week in the United States, Ceremonials entered the Billboard 200 at number six, while debuting atop the Alternative Albums, Rock Albums and Digital Albums charts. The album was certified platinum by the Recording Industry Association of America (RIAA) on 8 January 2015, and had sold 1,002,000 copies in the US by March 2015. As of May 2012, Ceremonials had sold 2 million copies worldwide.

Track listingNotes  signifies an additional producer
  signifies a remixer

Personnel
Credits adapted from the liner notes of the deluxe edition of Ceremonials.Florence and the Machine Florence Welch – vocals
 Robert Ackroyd – guitar 
 Christopher Lloyd Hayden – drums ; backing vocals ; percussion 
 Tom Monger – harp ; bass 
 Mark Saunders – backing vocals ; percussion ; bass ; additional guitar 
 Isabella Summers – piano ; drum programming ; strings, choir parts ; synth ; celeste, programming Additional musicians Jack Peñate – backing vocals 
 Sian Alice – backing vocals 
 Lisa Moorish – backing vocals 
 Jessie Ware – backing vocals 
 Rusty Bradshaw – keyboards ; Hammond organ 
 Sally Herbert – violin, string arrangements 
 Rick Koster – violin 
 Oli Langford – violin 
 Gillon Cameron – violin 
 Warren Zielinski – violin 
 Richard George – violin 
 Ian Burdge – cello 
 Max Baillie – viola 
 Lucy Shaw – double bass 
 Bullion – drum programming, additional esoteric sonics 
 Paul Epworth – pump organ 
 Nikolaj Torp Larsen – piano Technical Paul Epworth – production
 Mark Rankin – engineering ; mixing 
 Ted Jensen – mastering
 Tom Elmhirst – mixing 
 Ben Baptie – mixing assistance 
 Mark "Spike" Stent – mixing 
 Matty Green – mixing assistance 
 Craig Silvey – mixing 
 Bryan Wilson – mixing assistance 
 Isabella Summers – additional backing vocals recording 
 Ben Roulston – additional backing vocals recording 
 Peter Hutchings – engineering assistance
 Joseph Hartwell Jones – engineering assistance
 Henrik Michelsen – additional engineering assistanceArtwork Tabitha Denholm – art direction
 Tom Beard – photography
 Bravo Charlie Mike Hotel – layouts
 Emma Forrest – liner notes

Deluxe edition bonus discFlorence and the Machine Florence Welch – vocals ; bass 
 Isabella Summers – synth ; bass, programmed drums, bells 
 Robert Ackroyd – guitar 
 Tom Monger – harp 
 Christopher Lloyd Hayden – drums ; percussion ; backing vocals 
 Mark Saunders – percussion ; bass Additional musicians Sam Paul Evans – drums 
 Rusty Bradshaw – keyboards ; backing vocals ; piano 
 Bullion – drum programming, additional esoteric sonics 
 Eg White – all instruments Technical'''
 Isabella Summers – production 
 Ben Roulston – additional production, engineering 
 Austen Jux Chandler – engineering 
 Paul Epworth – production 
 Mark Rankin – engineering ; production assistance 
 Craig Silvey – mixing 
 Bryan Wilson – mixing assistance 
 Ted Jensen – mastering 
 Eg White – production 
 James Ford – production, mixing 
 Charlie Hugall – production, mixing

Charts

Weekly charts

Year-end charts

Decade-end charts

All-time charts

Certifications

Release history

References

2011 albums
Albums produced by Paul Epworth
Florence and the Machine albums
Island Records albums
Universal Republic Records albums
Neo soul albums
Power pop albums by English artists